Lepidoderma may refer to:
Lepidoderma (arthropod), a genus of prehistoric eurypterids
Lepidoderma (slime mold), a genus of myxomycete